Haverinen is a Finnish surname. Notable people with the surname include:

 Anna Haverinen (1884–1959), Finnish office worker and politician
 Joni Haverinen (born 1987), Finnish ice hockey player
 Markus Haverinen, Finnish ice hockey player
 Teuvo Haverinen,  Finnish professional darts player

Finnish-language surnames